Maxim Valeryevich Koptyakov is a Russian amateur boxer who won the silver medal at the 2008 European Amateur Boxing Championships in the middleweight division.

Russian national championships
Koptyakov won the 2008 middleweight Russian senior national championships beating Dmitriy Chudinov in the final 12-8.

European Amateur Championships
Koptyakov represented Russia at the 2008 European Amateur Boxing Championships in Liverpool, England. He won silver losing to the Ukraine's Ivan Senay 9-4 in the final.

European Championships results
2008 (as a Middleweight)
Preliminary round - BYE
Second round Defeated Naim Terbunja (Sweden) 7-5
Quarter Finals Defeated Mikalai Vesialou (Belarus) 12-3
Semi Finals Defeated Eamon O'Kane (Ireland) 10-2
Finals Lost to Ivan Senay (Ukraine) 4-9

References

1987 births
Living people
Middleweight boxers
Russian male boxers
Boxers at the 2015 European Games
European Games bronze medalists for Russia
European Games medalists in boxing